The Ou River or Oujiang is the second-largest river in the Zhejiang province of eastern China. The river flows  before finally reaching the city of Wenzhou and emptying into the East China Sea, into which it discharges  of water annually.  Shen Jiang, Jiang Yongjia, and Wenjiang are all former names for this river.

Fauna
The Ou River has a rich fish fauna. A 2010 survey recorded 60 different fish species, with goldfish, bagrid catfish, and  Pseudobagrus tenuis being the most prolific in range. Compared to a 1972 survey, 20 new species were recorded, including two alien species (Mozambique tilapia and largemouth bass); however, 34 species recorded in 1972 were absent in 2010, and overall fish density was lower.

Goby Pseudorhinogobius aporus is endemic to the Ou River system: it is only known from a brook in the upper Ou River system.

Notes

References

Rivers of Zhejiang